Selina Bahar Zaman (15 February 1940 – 4 December 2004) was a Bangladeshi writer and academician.

Background
Zaman was born Parveen Sultana Chaudhury to Habibullah Bahar Chowdhury and Anwara Bahar Chowdhury. Habibullah was a politician and journalist and Anwara was a social activist and writer.

Education
Zaman started her school life started at Kolkata. After her family's migration to Dhaka, she completed her matriculation examination from Qamrunnesa School in 1954. She then completed her bachelor's and master's in mathematics from the University of Dhaka in 1960. She started her career as a lecturer at the Eden Mohila College. She retired from the Jagannath University College in 1997 as the head of the department of mathematics.

Works
 Habibullah Bahar Smarak Grantha (1995)
 Jahur Hossain Chaudhury Smarak Grantha (1996)
 Anwara Bahar Chaudhury Smarak Grantha (1997)
 Shamsuddin Abul Kalam Smarak Grantha (1999)
 Shamsunnahar Mahmud Smarak Grantha (2002)
 Begum Rokeya Smarak Grantha (2002) 
 Shaukat Osman Smarak Grantha (2003)

References

1940 births
2004 deaths
University of Dhaka alumni
Academic staff of Eden Mohila College
Academic staff of Jagannath University
20th-century Bangladeshi writers
20th-century Bangladeshi women writers